The Somali Democratic Party (SDP), formerly the Ethiopian Somali People's Democratic Party, was a political party in Ethiopia, created by the ruling Ethiopian People's Revolutionary Democratic Front (EPRDF) after refusing Somali demands for self-determination in 1993. The EPRDF created a surrogate party called the Ethiopian Somali Democratic League which was one of many satellite organisations existing throughout Ethiopia. The organisation was led by Ahmed Shide.

History 
Like the ESDL before it, the Somali Democratic Party was considered by many inhabitants of the Somali Region to be an "EPRDF puppet", who accused its members "of brutal repression and systematic massacres in ensuring the region stays under firm control".

The party observed its eleventh anniversary of its founding in Filtu, where numerous improvements to the infrastructure of the Liben Zone were announced.

In December 2019, the party merged with the Afar National Democratic Party (ANDP), the Amhara Democratic Party (ADP), the Benishangul-Gumuz People's Democratic Unity Front (BGPDUF), the Gambela People's Democratic Movement (GPDM), the Hareri National League (HNL), the Oromo Democratic Party (ODP) and the Southern Ethiopian People's Democratic Movement (SEPDM) to form the new Prosperity Party.

Notes

1998 establishments in Ethiopia
2019 disestablishments in Ethiopia
Defunct political parties in Ethiopia
Defunct socialist parties
Democratic socialist parties in Africa
Ethiopian People's Revolutionary Democratic Front
Political parties disestablished in 2019
Political parties established in 1998
Socialist parties in Ethiopia